WELF-TV (channel 23) is a television station licensed to Dalton, Georgia, United States, serving the Chattanooga, Tennessee area as an owned-and-operated station of the Trinity Broadcasting Network (TBN). The station's transmitter is located on SR 157 in unincorporated west-central Walker County.

History

The station began operations on May 10, 1994. Outside of limited local programming in its history, WELF has mainly carried TBN's national service without deviation.

Digital television

References

External links
Official website

Trinity Broadcasting Network affiliates
Television channels and stations established in 1994
ELF-TV
1994 establishments in Georgia (U.S. state)
Dalton, Georgia